Ola John (born 19 May 1992) is a professional footballer who plays for Al-Hazem as a left winger. Born in Liberia, he has represented the Netherlands national team. 

A product of FC Twente's youth system, he played with their first team from 2010 to 2012 before joining S.L. Benfica. Amid a 2014 loan to Hamburger SV for half a season, he played regularly at Benfica in the seasons of 2012–13 and 2014–15. Afterwards, he was loaned out to Reading, Wolverhampton Wanderers and Deportivo de La Coruña. After playing only one match with Benfica's reserve team in 2017–18, he moved to Vitória for the upcoming season.

Internationally, John gained one cap for the Netherlands national team in 2013.

Club career

Twente
The 2011–12 season was the big breakthrough for John at Twente, as he got a starting place from Co Adriaanse at the start of the season, and did not lose that even with competition for the left forward position, as Nacer Chadli returned from injury. He also topped the UEFA Europa League group stage assist rankings with six assists. In Twente's home match in the Europa League against Odense BK on 3 November, John provided all three assists in a 3–2 win. John was influential in the Eredivisie campaign as well, netting two goals in a 6–2 victory over FC Utrecht on 4 December 2011.

Benfica and loans
On 24 May 2012, John signed for Portuguese club Benfica on a five-year deal which included a €45 million release clause for a transfer fee of €9.1 million according to Football Leaks. It was rumored that 80% of the undisclosed went to sports investment company Doyen Sports. After struggling to find his space in the first team during his initial months in Lisbon, John became a regular starter or used substitute in the second half of Benfica's 2012–13 campaign, which included appearances in UEFA Europa League and Portuguese Cup finals.

He was loaned to Hamburger SV for the remainder of the 2013–14 season on 17 January 2014. He stayed at Benfica for the new season, scoring his first league goal on 12 September 2014 against Vitória Sétubal. On 5 October, he gave two assists in a 4–0 home win against Arouca in Portuguese league. On 29 May 2015, John scored the winning goal against Marítimo (2–1) in the league cup final.

On 1 September 2015, John was loaned out to Football League Championship side Reading for one season. Reading had an option to sign him on a permanent deal at the end of the loan spell. He scored his first goal for Reading in the home match against Huddersfield Town on 3 November 2015. On 22 August 2016, John returned to the Championship, to join Wolverhampton Wanderers on a season-long loan.

After an injury-ridden loan spell at Wolves, limiting his game time to a total of 71 minutes in all competitions, his loan was cut short on 13 January 2017 and he instead joined Deportivo de La Coruña on loan until the end of the season. In August 2017, it was reported that Ola John refused to be loaned to Panathinaikos and to Qarabağ.

Vitória de Guimarães
On 21 July 2018, John signed a three-year contract with Vitória S.C. in Primeira Liga.

International career
In February 2012, John was called up for the first time by Bert van Marwijk to represent the senior Netherlands football team for the game against England at Wembley. On 7 May 2012, he was named in the provisional list of 36 players for the UEFA Euro 2012 tournament, one of nine uncapped players to be chosen by Netherlands manager Bert van Marwijk as part of the preliminary squad.

Personal life
As a two-year-old, John fled with his mother and brothers from Liberia to the Netherlands. His father was killed during the First Liberian Civil War. He did not return to the African continent until the U-17 World Championship in Nigeria in 2009. As a child, he played at the amateur club VV DES in Nijverdal. Like his brothers Collins and Paddy, Ola joined the youth academy of Twente.

Career statistics

Honours
Twente
KNVB Cup: 2010–11
Johan Cruijff Shield: 2011

Benfica
Primeira Liga: 2013–14, 2014–15, 2015–16
Taça de Portugal: 2013–14
Taça da Liga: 2013–14, 2014–15
Supertaça Cândido de Oliveira: 2014
UEFA Europa League runner-up: 2012–13

References

External links
 
 
 
 

1992 births
Living people
People from Grand Gedeh County
Association football wingers
Dutch footballers
Netherlands under-21 international footballers
Netherlands youth international footballers
Netherlands international footballers
Dutch people of Liberian descent
Sportspeople of Liberian descent
Liberian emigrants to the Netherlands
Naturalised citizens of the Netherlands
FC Twente players
S.L. Benfica footballers
Hamburger SV players
Reading F.C. players
Wolverhampton Wanderers F.C. players
Deportivo de La Coruña players
S.L. Benfica B players
Vitória S.C. players
RKC Waalwijk players
Al-Hazem F.C. players
Eredivisie players
Primeira Liga players
Bundesliga players
English Football League players
La Liga players
Liga Portugal 2 players
Saudi Professional League players
Saudi First Division League players
Dutch expatriate footballers
Dutch expatriate sportspeople in Portugal
Dutch expatriate sportspeople in Germany
Dutch expatriate sportspeople in England
Dutch expatriate sportspeople in Spain
Dutch expatriate sportspeople in Saudi Arabia
Expatriate footballers in Portugal
Expatriate footballers in Germany
Expatriate footballers in England
Expatriate footballers in Spain
Expatriate footballers in Saudi Arabia